6433 Enya, provisional designation , is a stony background asteroid from the inner regions of the asteroid belt, approximately  in diameter. It was discovered on 18 November 1978, by Czech astronomer Antonín Mrkos at the Kleť Observatory in the Czech Republic. It was named for Irish musician Enya.

Orbit and classification 

Enya is a non-family asteroid from the main belt's background population. It orbits the Sun in the inner asteroid belt at a distance of 1.9–2.9 AU once every 3 years and 8 months (1,348 days). Its orbit has an eccentricity of 0.22 and an inclination of 9° with respect to the ecliptic. The body's observation arc, however, begins with its official discovery observation at Kleť in 1978.

Physical characteristics 

Enya is a presumed S-type asteroid.

Rotation period 

In March 2013, a fragmentary rotational lightcurve  of Enya was obtained from photometric observations at the Palomar Transient Factory in California. Lightcurve analysis gave a rotation period of 7.4 hours with a brightness variation of 0.08 magnitude.

As of 2017, no other lightcurve has since been obtained from Enya.

Diameter and albedo 

According to the survey carried out by NASA's Wide-field Infrared Survey Explorer with its subsequent NEOWISE mission, Enya measures between 6.69 and 7.416 kilometers in diameter, and its surface has an albedo between 0.012 and 0.090.

The Collaborative Asteroid Lightcurve Link assumes a standard albedo for stony asteroids of 0.20 and calculates a diameter of 3.68 kilometers with an absolute magnitude of 14.54.

Naming 

This minor planet was named after Eithne Pádraigín Ní Bhraonáin (born 1961), known as Enya, an Irish singer, songwriter, musician, and producer. Naming was proposed by G. V. Williams and published on 20 June 1997.

References

External links 
 About (6433) Enya, Rock & Roll Minor Planets, Minor Planet Center
 Asteroid Lightcurve Database (LCDB), query form (info )
 Dictionary of Minor Planet Names, Google books
 Asteroids and comets rotation curves, CdR – Observatoire de Genève, Raoul Behrend
 Discovery Circumstances: Numbered Minor Planets (5001)-(10000) – Minor Planet Center
 
 

006433
Discoveries by Antonín Mrkos
Named minor planets
6433 Enya
19781118